Catherine Owen may refer to:

 Catherine Dale Owen (1900–1965), American stage and film actress
 Catherine Owen (writer), Canadian writer and musician